Help & Manual is a Windows-based help authoring tool published by EC Software, a company based in Austria.

Like many help authoring tools, Help & Manual allows the writer to create a single source text which it then converts to a number of target formats. In this case, the author creates the source text using an editor built into the Help & Manual program. The text, along with the user's settings for the project, are stored in XML files.

Version history 
Version 7.0 of Help & Manual was released June 2015. It supports the following output formats:

 PDF
 Compiled HTML
 HTML Web Page
 Visual Studio Help
 Microsoft Word
 eBook (Windows executable containing an embedded viewer)
 ePUB e-books
 Amazon Kindle e-books
 Printed manuals

Version 4.x of Help & Manual also supports Unicode for creating help in all international languages, including Asian languages like Chinese, Japanese and Thai but excluding right-to-left languages.

Version 5.x of Help & Manual contains a completely redesigned Ribbon interface, and permits multiple users to collaborate and work on a single help project at the same time.

Version 6.x of Help & Manual has a slightly modified user interface and adds support for the ePUB publishing format.

Version 7.x of Help & Manual adds support for Team Foundation Server version control and the Amazon Kindle publishing format.

The program comes bundled with several tools, including a screenshot capture tool, a graphics program with functions for editing and enhancing screenshots, a help context tool for managing, importing and exporting help context numbers, a "print manual designer" for creating and editing layout templates for PDF files and printed manuals and a reporting tool for generating and exporting project reports.

 3.x - used RTF-based source files with a .HM3 extension.
 4.x - uses XML-based source files with a .HMX extension
 5.x - uses XML-based source files with a .HMXZ extension
 6.x - project source files compatible with version 5
 7.x - project source files compatible with version 5 and 6

External links 
 
Slovak distribution & support website

Online help
Technical communication tools